Itkuchukovo (Etkösök) is a rural locality (a village) in Abitovsky Selsoviet, Meleuzovsky District, Bashkortostan, Russia. The population was 235 as of 2010. There are 3 streets.

Geography 
Itkuchukovo is located 31 km east of Meleuz (the district's administrative centre) by road. Abitovo is the nearest rural locality.

References 

Rural localities in Meleuzovsky District